The West Africa Network for Peacebuilding (WANEP) is a leading Regional Peacebuilding organisation founded in 1998 in response to civil wars that plagued West Africa in the 1990s. Over the years, WANEP has succeeded in establishing strong national networks in every Member State of ECOWAS with over 550 member organisations across West Africa. WANEP places special focus on collaborative approaches to conflict prevention, and peacebuilding, working with diverse actors from civil society, governments, intergovernmental bodies, women groups and other partners in a bid to establish a platform for dialogue, experience sharing and learning, thereby complementing efforts at ensuring sustainable peace and development in West Africa and beyond.

History and founders
WANEP was founded by two distinguished Africans; Samuel Gbaydee Doe and Emmanuel Habuka Bombande. Sam Gbadyee Doe is a peacebuilding and development professional from Liberia. He began his academic career from the University of Liberia where he studied Economics with the intention of being a banker and later proceeded to the Eastern Mennonite University for his MA in conflict transformation and Bradford University in the U.K. for a PhD. It was at EMU that the dream for the establishment of WANEP began when his paths crossed with John Paul Lederach and Emmanuel Bombande.

Mr. Emmanuel Habuka Bombande is a Ghanaian National Peacebuilding Practitioner with proven expertise in conflict transformation, peacebuilding, and development. After his social science degree from the Kwame Nkrumah University of Science and Technology-Kumasi Ghana, Mr. Bombande proceeded to the Eastern Mennonite University, USA for a master's degree in Conflict Transformation. It was there he met Sam Doe leading to the birth of WANEP.

The story of WANEP cannot be completely told without mentioning the invaluable contributions of Professor John Paul Lederach especially during the formation and nurturing stages of the institution which he described as …”Beginning of a new era of peace, healing, reconciliation and hope in West Africa.” He was instrumental to bringing together and mentoring the two co-founders of WANEP.

Based on Sam Doe's background in working with trauma during the Second Liberian Civil War, and in establishing youth dialogue organizations and Bombande’s efforts with Hizkias Assefa at the Nairobi Peace Initiative in resolving the Kokomba-Nanumba conflict in northern Ghana, WANEP focused on both lessening existing conflicts and preventing future outbreaks. By directing efforts toward grassroots efforts the organization helped local leaders and citizens resolve conflicts without outside intervention.

Leadership
Samuel Gbaydee Doe served as the executive director of WANEP from its formation in 1998 until 2004. In 2004, then director of programs, Emmanuel Bombande was appointed executive director. In 2015,Dr. Chukwuemeka Eze, formerly the Program Director
took over from Bombande as the Executive Director while Levinia Addae-Mensah is the Deputy Executive Director/Program Director.

Programs and Organizations
WANEP has a niche in training CSOs, government and other practitioners in peacebuilding and conflict prevention.  This niche has worked well in supporting peace and averting conflict in many situations.  WANEP implements programs to equip the youth, business owners, women, traditional leaders and state agencies with requisite skills in conflict prevention and supports them to find local solutions or interventions to their unique conflict situations. WANEP emphasizes ownership and bottom-up approach to peacebuilding practice which enables the National Networks to carry out interventions that reflect the peculiarities of human security issues in their various countries. The national networks represent the WANEP brand and work in member states while the Regional Secretariat engages at the strategic level with ECOWAS, AU, UN and other intergovernmental, governmental and non-governmental organizations.

Strategic Focus
WANEP's key area of focus includes but not limited to the following;

  	Early Warning and Response (WARN)
  	Nonviolence and Peace Education (NAPE) 
  	Capacity-Building & Development
  	Engendering Women in Peacebuilding Programs (WIPNET) 
  	Dialogue and Mediation
  	Civil Society Coordination and Democratic Governance
  	Gender
  	Research and Publication

Key Impact/Achievements
Under the WIPNET program, WANEP facilitated the Liberian Women Mass action for Peace initiated by Liberian Women in 2003. The women peace activism’s intervention in Liberia under the WIPNET program, led to the eventual ceasefire in the Liberian war. The outcome of the Liberian peace process and the role of WIPNET have been acknowledged all over the world and led to the Nobel Peace Prize awarded to Her Excellency Ellen Johnson and Lemay Gbowe (WANEP Liberia former Coordinator for the WIPNET program). The mass action for peace is credited with urging Charles Taylor’s government and the Liberians for Reconciliation and Democracy (LURD) into a ceasefire and leading to the end of the conflict. WANEP also facilitated the creation of ‘Peace Hut’ in Liberia to facilitate the reconciliation process and provide environment for victims to meet and reconcile with offenders. This concept was replicated in Cote d'Ivoire.

President Ellen Johnson Sirleaf has cited WIPNET as being one of the key factors supporting women’s prominent role in peace building in Liberia.
In 2015, WANEP signed an MOU with the African Union Commission to provide support to the Commission’s Peace and Security Department in the implementation of the AU Peace and Security Architecture (APSA) including the gender mainstreaming of the architecture.

The work of WANEP in establishing an early warning system has been instrumental in helping to resolve multiple conflicts in early stages.  In 2014 this effort was officially recognized by Cote d’Ivoire’s permanent representative to the United Nations Youssoufou Bamba in his official remarks at the Informal interactive Dialogue on the Responsibility to Protect: "Fulfilling our collective responsibility: International assistance and the responsibility to protect,", September 8, 2014.

WANEP experience in peacebuilding has been sought for replication in East and Central Africa. The unique structure of WANEP contributed to WANEP’s choice as the Civil Society implementing partner for the operationalization of ECOWAS Early Warning Mechanism (ECOWARN).

In this regard, allow me to note the remarkable work done by the Ivorian section of the West Africa Network for Peacebuilding, WANEP-CI, which has set up an independent early warning system, in particular through the dissemination of monthly reports. of the collection of information, relating to human security, and which naturally aims to support actions to prevent conflicts and promote peace in Côte d'Ivoire.

In September 2013 WANEP was also recognized for their work with ECOWAS to promote peace education in selected secondary schools across the region. These studies will impart new ways of thinking and new way of viewing conflict thereby leading to building new structures and cultural practices in the society that deepens peaceful coexistence. 

ECOWAS/WANEP relationship was the first example of civil society and intergovernmental partnership not only in West Africa but Africa generally. The partnership has been highlighted as the best practice of building alliances with CSOs in conflict prevention and is a referral point

Affiliations
The organization works with several regional partners including the Economic Community of West African States, the African Union’s Economic, Social, and Cultural Council ECOSOCC, and the United Nations Economic and Social Council(ECOSOC). WANEP is also a member of the Peace and Security cluster of ECOSOCC representing West Africa, and is the West Africa Regional Representative of the Global Partnership for the Prevention of Armed Conflict (GPPAC)and the Focal Point for Africa CSOs on the AU-EU Joint Strategy (JAES).

Strategic Partnerships

In 2002, WANEP entered into a historic partnership with the Economic Community of West African States (ECOWAS) in the implementation of a regional early warning and response system referred to as ECOWARN. In 2004, WANEP and ECOWAS signed a Memorandum of Understanding (MOU) which has consistently been renewed. this inter-governmental structure acts as a regional early warning and response system. WANEP and ECOWAS partnership enables typically non-governmental organizations a path to Track 1 diplomacy efforts early on in conflicts.

Inspired by its desire to contribute and commit to the sustenance of peace during elections, WANEP in collaboration with United States Agency for International Development (USAID) is implementing a five-year project (2015 to 2019) tagged, “Mitigating Election Violence in West Africa through National Early Warning Systems (NEWS)” in target countries of West Africa namely, Burkina Faso, Cote d’Ivoire, Niger, Ghana and Sierra Leone. Through this project, WANEP set up and operationalized an election situation room during elections in those countries. WANEP also partnered with other key stakeholders to run similar rooms in countries such as Benin, The Gambia and Nigeria.

WANEP is working in partnership with the Kofi Annan International Peacekeeping Training Centre (KAIPTC) in Accra, Ghana to run the West Africa Peacebuilding Institute (WAPI)

References

WANEP Publications and Reports (www.wanep.org/resource page)

International organizations based in Africa
Conflict (process)
Dispute resolution
West Africa
Peace organizations
Organizations established in 1998
Peacebuilding
International development in Africa